The Fairchild 660 is a tube-based single-channel audio compressor invented by Rein Narma and manufactured by the Fairchild Recording Equipment Corporation beginning in 1959. The 660 was the first intelligent automatic volume control limiter. The Fairchild 670, introduced shortly after the 660, is a dual-channel version. The rarity of Fairchild compressors has made them highly desirable and very valuable, with a used 660 now selling for $20,000 or more and a 670 selling for $30-$40,000 or more. They are commonly referred to as the "holy grail" of outboard gear.

History 
The 660 was designed by Rein Narma, who had worked with Les Paul to build a recording mixer to use with Les Paul's Ampex 8-track. Les Paul asked Narma if he would build a compressor/limiter. Sherman Fairchild, who was friends with Les Paul, learned of the compressor and licensed Narma's compressor design, hiring Narma to be chief engineer at Fairchild Recording Equipment Corporation. The first 10 Fairchild 660 were built by Narma himself. The first unit was sold to Rudy Van Gelder who used it to cut lacquer masters for Blue Note Records and Vox Records. The second unit went to Olmsted Sound Studios in New York City, and the third 660 built went to Mary Ford and Les Paul.

Design 
The mono 660 and dual-channel 670 can function as a compressor with a ratio of 2 to 1 and a threshold of 5 db below normal program level, as a peak limiter with a compression ratio of 30 to 1 and a threshold of 10 db above normal program level, or can operate anywhere between those two extremes. Utilizing a single push-pull stage of amplification and an extremely high control voltage, the sound of the 660 and 670 is characterized by the complete absence of audible thumps, with extremely low distortion and noise. Both feature an extremely fast attack time that can produce the full limiting effect during the first 1/10,000 of a second. This extremely fast attack time is combined with six different variable release timing curves, three of those making the release time an automatic function of the amount of limiting used, making the 660 the first compressor/limiter to feature automatic variable release time.

The 660 has controls for input gain, threshold, and time constant. The dual-channel 670 has the added flexibility of being able to be used either as two independent limiters or as a vertical and lateral (sum and difference) component limiter. At the time of its introduction, the 670 was the only unit that could independently control both vertical and lateral with a minimum loss of separation.

The 670 employs 20 tubes, 11 transformers, and 2 inductors. It is housed in a 14 rack space unit and weighs 65 pounds.

Notable Users 

Abbey Road Studios purchased 12 Fairchild 660s after staff engineer Peter Bown heard it during a visit to Capitol Records in America, and used it on recording sessions for the Beatles, primarily for vocals. Beginning in 1966, Geoff Emerick began using the 660 on Ringo Starr's drum tracks as well as piano and guitar tracks. Abbey Road still has 8 of the original 660s purchased in the 1960s

Other notable users include:
 Chris Thomas (on Pete Townshend solo albums)

 Jack Joseph Puig

 Tom Elmhirst (on the Amy Winehouse song "Rehab") and on the Adele song "Hello"

Legacy 
The dual-channel Fairchild 670 was inducted into the TECnology Hall of Fame in 2007.

References

External links 
 AES Oral History 048: Rein Narma

Dynamics processing
Effects units